My Contracted Husband, Mr. Oh is a 2018 South Korean television series starring Kim Kang-woo, Uee, Jung Sang-hoon, and Han Sun-hwa. It aired every Saturday from March 3, 2018 on MBC TV from 8:45 p.m. to 11:10 p.m. (KST), 2 episodes a day.

Plot 
Han Seung-Joo (Uee) is a single woman in her mid 30s who works as a PD at a broadcasting station. She does well at her job, but is not nearly as good when it comes to housework. Han Seung-Joo has a hard time dealing with social prejudices about single women. To get the position of a "married woman," Han Seung-Joo marries Oh Jak-Doo (Kim Kang-Woo) who lives in the mountain. Their marriage is not based on love, but their relationship develops romantically.

Cast

Main 
 Kim Kang-woo as Oh Jak-doo/Oh-Hyuk a recluse who makes gayageum.
 Uee as Han Seung-joo. A freelance PD, who believes having a husband will solve her traumatic experience.
 Jung Sang-hoon as Eric Cho/Cho Bong-Sik
 Han Sun-hwa as Jang Eun-jo

Supporting 
 Han Sang-jin as Bang Yong-min
 Park Jung-soo as Park Jung-ok
 Seol Jung-hwan as Han Seung-tae
 Park Min-ji as Kwon Se-mi
 Jung Chan as Hong In-pyo
 Jung Soo-young as Park Kyung-sook
 Kim Bo-mi as Bang Jung-mi
 Oh Mi-yeon as Kim Gan-nan
 Park Hye-jin as Na Joong-rye
 Bang Eun-hee as Bae Yi-bi
 Choi Sung-jae as Oh Byung-chul
 Seo Woo-jin as (Supporting)

Production 
 Kim Hyun-joo and then Lee Min-jung were offered the lead female role, but declined.
 The first script reading took place January 21, 2018.

Ratings 
In the table below,  represent the lowest ratings and  represent the highest ratings.

Awards and nominations

Notes

References

External links 
  

 

Korean-language television shows
2018 South Korean television series debuts
MBC TV television dramas
Television series by Pan Entertainment
2018 South Korean television series endings
South Korean melodrama television series